The Millennium Democratic Party (Tetum: Partido Milénio Democrático) is a centrist political party in East Timor founded in July 2004 and registered on 30 December 2005. In the parliamentary election held on 30 June 2007, the party won 0.69% of the total votes and did not win any seats in parliament, as it did not reach the 3% threshold to win seats.

References

Political parties in East Timor